Mar Lodge Estate is the largest remnant of the ancient Earldom of Mar in Aberdeenshire, Scotland and is now owned by the National Trust for Scotland.

Allanaquoich

A locality on the east bank of the Quoich Water close to its confluence with the River Dee.

Altanour Lodge

A ruined hunting lodge (pronounced like Altan Ower), at the head of Glen Ey (southern-end), in a small plantation of spruce and larch.

Named from the nearby stream Alltan Odhar - dun streamlet (Watson 1975).

A landrover road runs between Altanour Lodge and the public road at Inverey.

Am Beitheachan
A locality (pronounced like be-a-chan) in Glen Quoich upstream of where the Dubh Ghleann joins it near the foot of Beinn a' Bhùird - the little birch place - (Watson 1975).
{{blockquote|Although local people always call this E [Glen Quoich as it turns eastward] part the Beitheachan and not the Quoich, all the maps have omitted it.|Watson (1975)}}

In Watson (1975) the author is evidently relying on his deep understanding of the local Gaelic for spelling and pronunciation, because in Dixon and Green (1995) (relying of documents) refer to the locality as Beachan - discussing a proposal to put the rental of specific shielings up for public roup (auction):

Black Bridge
The bridge in Glen Lui over the Lui Water roughly halfway between Linn of Lui and Derry Wood - see main reference in Glen Lui article.

Bynack Lodge

Along with Derry Lodge, and Geldie Lodge - one of the 'three main' hunting lodges on the estate built in the late nineteenth-century during the rise of hunting on the estate - Dixon and Green (1995).

Chest of Dee
A series of waterfalls and deep pools on the River Dee slightly up-river from White Bridge.

From Ciste Dhe - Watson (1975).

Clach nan Taillear
Clach nan Taillear stone of the tailors - Watson (1975) is a large stone by the Lairig Ghru where:

Corriemulzie

A locality on the Linn of Dee road.

Corrour Bothy

A simple stone building in the Lairig Ghru, at the point below Cairn Toul, used as a Mountain Refuge.

Derry Dam
He continues:Michie (pronounced like Mickey) is John Grant Michie (1830–1904) a Minister of Dinnet author of Deeside Tales (1872), Loch Kinnord (1877), Logie-Coldstone (1896), and Records of Invercauld (1901) - Wyness (1968).

Derry Lodge
Along with Bynack Lodge, and Geldie Lodge - one of the 'three main' hunting lodges on the estate built in the late nineteenth-century during the rise of hunting on the estate - Dixon and Green (1995).

Located within Derry Wood on the slopes of Derry Cairngorm, it was likely used as temporary accommodation for shooting parties to reduce the need to return to Mar Lodge at night.

Derry Wood
A wooded locality on the slopes of Derry Cairngorm, where Glen Derry, and Glen Luibeg join at the head of Glen Lui - see main reference in
Glen Lui article.

Dubh Ghleann
A glen that joins Glen Quoich near the foot of Beinn a Bhuird (pronounced like do glen) - from dark valley - Watson (1975).

Gallows Tree
A tree on the south-bank of the River Dee a short distance west of Victoria Bridge that was used as a gallows.

The date of its last use is not known, but in Wyness (1968) the author recounts the story of a curse against the Farquharsons being fulfilled in 1806 when the "direct male line of Farquharson came to an end". The curse - as he relates - was against a "Farquharson laird" who had sentenced a Lamont of Inverey to death for "cattle-rustling and sheep-steeling".

The tree is dead, supported by wires, and has been since at least 1925.

Geldie Lodge

Along with Bynack Lodge, and Derry Lodge - one of the 'three main' hunting lodges on the estate built in the late nineteenth-century during the rise of hunting on the estate - Dixon and Green (1995).

While describing the course of the River Dee in Anderson (1911) - the author mentions that Geldie Lodge had been tenanted for many years by Lord Farquhar a friend of the estate's owner, the Duke of Fife.

Glen Lui

One of the main glens of the estate.

Glen Quoich
One of the main glens of the estate.

Inverey

The only remaining hamlet on Mar Lodge Estate.

Lairig Ghru

A route and mountain pass that partially lies on Mar Lodge Estate. To its west is The Devil's Point.

Luibeg
A cottage and locality around the Luibeg Burn where it joins with the Derry Burn to create the Lui Water - see main reference in Glen Lui article.Luibeg Cottage has been home to many of the estate's deer-stalkers or keepers.

March Burn
Is a burn in the Lairig Ghru slightly to the east of the pass summit - the Mar Lodge Estate side.

In the first paragraph of Gordon (1925) the author uses the term 'march' in the old-sense of a boundary:

He again uses the term in the old-sense when describing a September crossing of the Lairig Ghru where he gives the burn its old as well as its contemporary Anglicised name:

Mar Lodge

The 'main house' on Mar Lodge Estate, built in 1895 for Alexander Duff, 1st Duke of Fife.

Mar Lodge Brae
Is the name of the incline between Corriemulzie and the Victoria Bridge.

Pools of Dee
Three small pools near the summit of the Lairig Ghru on the Corrour side.

The old name was Lochan Dubh na Lairige - black tarn of the Lairig - Watson (1975) who adds:

Erroneous because the pools are not the source of the River Dee - see Wells of Dee

Preas nam Meirleach

Literally copse of the robbers - Watson (1975), but colloquially known as Robbers Copse - the wooded locality were the route between Glen Luibeg and the Lairig Ghru crosses the Luibeg Burn.

On the Luibeg side of Preas nam Meirleach - Watson (1975) names the Sands of Lui describing it as a stretch of gravel washed down by the floods in 1829 and 1956.

The flood of 1829 is 'remembered' in Deeside as the Muckle Spate. On the evening of the 2nd of August 1829 it began raining, and continued into the next day when a thunder storm broke in the afternoon over the Cairngorms. The Dee being the main river of the district rose rapidly above its normal level -  in places (27 ft at Banchory) carrying away the bridges over the Linn of Dee, and Linn of Quoich - Wyness (1968).

Ruighe Ealasaid

Ruighe Ealasaid – meaning 'Elizabeth's shiel' – Watson and Allen 1984 is a partially ruined house in Glen Geldie close to the confluence of the Bynack Burn with the Geldie Burn.

Like other place names on the estate incorporating 'shiel' - the name probably pre-dates the existing building bearing the name.

Ruigh nan clach

Ruigh nan clach – meaning 'sheil of the stones' – Watson and Allen 1984 is a ruined keeper's house near the bank of the Geldie Burn a short distance upstream from White Bridge.

The name is derived from 'Ruighe nan clach' – and commemorates an earlier sheiling nearby.

St Ninian's Chapel

St Ninian's Chapel stands immediately adjacent to Mar Lodge and was originally the private chapel of the owners of Mar Lodge. Alexander Duff, 1st Duke of Fife, and his family are buried in the chapel.

Sapper's Bothy
A ruined stone 'bothy' just east of the summit of Ben Macdui built around 1847 by (or for the use of) the survey team from the Ordnance Survey who surveyed the Cairn Gorm / Ben Macdui plateau. This survey settled the argument over whether Ben Macdui or Ben Nevis was the highest mountain in Britain.

In Watson (1975) the author gives its map reference as 991988.

Sneck
The Sneck is the name of the bealach between Beinn a' Bhùird and Ben Avon - Watson (1975), and the 1:25000 series Ordnance Survey maps.

Victoria Bridge

The white iron bridge over the Dee at Mar Lodge.

Wells of Dee

The source of the River Dee, the water rising from a spring on the Braeriach / Einich Cairn plateau at about 1,220 m (4,000 ft) - Watson (1975) - who continues:

The Ordnance Survey maps name the waterfall the Falls of Dee, the corrie as An Garbh Choire, and the burn as Allt a Gharbh choire. Covering the same ground earlier in the twentieth century - Anderson (1911) records:

That 'defile' being the Lairig Ghru.

White Bridge

The bridge over the River Dee near its confluence with the Geldie Burn - carrying the estate road to the south-bank of the River Dee giving access to:
 Glen Geldie and Geldie Lodge (ruin)
 Glen Bynack and Bynack Lodge (ruin)
 Glen Tilt

Sources
 
 
 
 
 
 

Places and place names on Mar Lodge Estate